Cities XXL is a city-building computer game developed by Focus Home Interactive as a sequel to their earlier game Cities XL Platinum. The game allows players to design, build, and manage cities.

Gameplay

Zoning 

The game offers the designation of three types of building lots: residential, commercial and industrial. Each of which can have a different density. Residential lots have four social classes: unskilled workers, skilled workers, executives, and elites. Before designating building lots, the game requires players to select which class of residents may live there. The social class chosen for a lot will not be modified by the simulation.

To create building lots, players can zone an area of the map in which, upon confirmation, individual building lots will be created by the game. Players can also plop building lots individually.

Transport 

Cities XXL allows players to create a road network of a variety of road types at many different angles and curvatures. Bridges and tunnels are also part of the simulator. Other transport options are buses, trains, ferries, and subways.

Reception 

Cities XXL received "generally unfavorable reviews" according to the review aggregation website Metacritic. Many of the reviews were negative due to lack of new content, and poor multithreading support, which was a selling point of the game.

See also 
 City Life

References

External links 

 Cities XXL official website

2015 video games
City-building games
Video games developed in France
Windows games
Windows-only games
Single-player video games
Video games with Steam Workshop support
Video game sequels
Focus Entertainment games